Hans Bauer (16 January 1878 – 3 June 1937) was a German semitist and professor at the University of Halle in the early 1930s.  He was involved in the decipherment of Ugaritic cuneiform on clay tablets discovered in Ras Shamra, Ugarit.

References

Further reading
 Holger Gzella: "Hans Bauer und die historisch-vergleichende Semitistik," in: Otto Jastrow et al. (eds.), Studien zur Semitistik und Arabistik. Festschrift für Hartmut Bobzin zum 60. Geburtstag. Wiesbaden: Harrassowitz 2008, pp. 141–182.

German scholars
Semiticists
1878 births
1937 deaths